Marcus Jones may refer to:

Sportspeople
Marcus Jones (cornerback) (born 1998), American football cornerback
Marcus Jones (athlete) (born 1973), American martial arts fighter and former American football defensive end
Marcus Jones (baseball) (born 1975), former American Major League Baseball pitcher
Marcus Jones (footballer) (born 1974), English football defender

Other people
Marcus Jones (politician) (born 1974), MP for Nuneaton, Warwickshire, England
Marquis D. Jones Jr., State of New Jersey Superior Court Judge
Marcus E. Jones (1852–1934), American geologist

See also
Marc Jones (disambiguation)
Mark Jones (disambiguation)